Lohengrin is a son of the hero Percival in German art and literature.

Lohengrin may also refer to:

 Lohengrin (opera), the 1850 opera by German composer Richard Wagner
 Lohengrin (Sciarrino), a contemporary short work by Italian composer Salvatore Sciarrino
 9505 Lohengrin, a main-belt asteroid
 VfB Lohengrin 03 Kleve, former German football club in the city that merged with Sportclub Kleve 63 to form 1. FC Kleve
 Dietrich von Lohengrin, an antagonist in the Trinity Blood franchise
 Lohengrin, a German ace from the Wild Cards anthology series